Presidential elections were held in Serbia on 6 May 2012 alongside parliamentary elections. The elections were called following President Boris Tadić's early resignation in order to coincide with the parliamentary and local elections to be held on the same date. The Speaker of the Parliament, Slavica Đukić Dejanović, took over as the Acting President. As no candidate won a majority, a runoff was on 20 May, with incumbent Tadić facing Tomislav Nikolić of the Serbian Progressive Party.

According to preliminary results published by CeSID, Ipsos and RIK, Tomislav Nikolić had beaten his opponent Boris Tadić and is the new President of Serbia. Official results confirmed that, putting Nikolić at 51% against Tadić's 49%.

Candidates
First round of the elections was held on 6 May. Republic Electoral Commission has confirmed twelve candidates. Candidate numbers were decided using a random draw on 20 April.

Campaign
Both the SNS and the DS supported Serbia's candidature for the EU, with the SNS' Nikolić having sharply contrasted his stance in the past few years. A few hours before the voting centres opened, Tadić told Croatian television that "anything else [than a Democratic Party victory] would be a big risk and a big gamble for Serbia's European integration [and] for regional politics."

Shortly after the first round, a preliminary coalition agreement between the DS and the SPS was reached, which meant that the SPS would also endorse Tadić in the run-off. The DSS officially supported Nikolić in the run-off.

Monitors
The Center for Free Elections and Democracy were amongst the electoral observers.

Results
About 6.7 million people were eligible to vote for the 12 candidates. The Organization for Security and Co-operation in Europe will undertake the organization of voting for the roughly 109,000 Serb voters in Kosovo.  These results include the districts of the newly formed Republic of Kosovo, which at the same time has elections independent of the Serbian nation. Voting stations were open from 7:00 to 20:00 with no incidents reported across the country. Voter turnout by 18:00 was 46.34% in Belgrade, 48.37% in central Serbia and 47.89% in Vojvodina. The first round resulted in no clear victory for any candidate. With 25% of ballots counted, Boris Tadić was leading with 26.7% over Tomislav Nikolić who had 25.5% of the vote.

Second round preliminary results
Incumbent Boris Tadić has lost the presidential elections in Serbia to his opponent, Tomislav Nikolić from the Serbian Progressive Party. Nikolić has won 49.7% of the votes in the runoff of the Serbian presidential elections on Sunday vs. 47% for Tadić, according to data of the Serbian Center for Free Elections and Democracy. This electional results are surprise, as stated by Russian media, based on previous polls. "This was an electoral earthquake, a totally unexpected result," political analyst Slobodan Antonić said on Serbia's RTS state television. Thousands of Nikolić supporters gathered in central Belgrade and other Serbian towns late on Sunday, honking their horns in celebration.

Results

References

Presidential elections in Serbia
Serbia
Serbia
Pres